Jicheng or Ji City may refer to:

 Jicheng (Beijing) (/), an ancient city now part of Beijing
 Jicheng, an ancient city now part of Yi County, Liaoning
 Jicheng, ancient city in western China known for the Siege of Jicheng in the Romance of the Three Kingdoms
 Jicheng, Shanxi, town in Yushe County
 Jicheng Road Subdistrict, Jinshui District, Zhengzhou, Henan